is a Japanese music variety television show that was broadcast by TV Tokyo from April 3, 2006, to March 26, 2007. It is the substantial remake of Heavymeta-san that was broadcast in 2005 in Japan. Despite the title, the key genre in the program is heavy metal, just like Heavymeta-san.

In June 2020, "Rock Fujiyama" official YouTube channel was established.

List of guests 
 #01 - Kohei Otomo
 #02 - Hideki Saijo
 #03 - Masaki Kyomoto
 #04 - Kenji Ohtsuki
 #05 - Yoshio Nomura
 #06 - Nanase Aikawa
 #07 - Takanori Takeyama
 #08 - Shinya
 #09 - Shirō Sano
 #10 - Noriko Aota
 #11 - MCU
 #12 - Takahiro Azuma
 #13 - Kaela Kimura
 #14 - Andrew W.K.
 #15 - Takashi Utsunomiya, Jake Shimabukuro
 #16 - Hiroshi "Mush" Kamayatsu, DragonForce
 #17 - Genki Sudo
 #18 - Demon Kogure
 #19 - Masahiro Takashima, Luke Takamura
 #20 - Kone, Luke Takamura
 #21 - Kankuro Kudo
 #22 - Kohei Otomo
 #23 - Football Hour
 #24 - Paul Gilbert
 #25 - Beni Arashiro
 #26 - Takako Shirai, Hajime Anzai
 #27 - Koji Yamamoto
 #28 - Maki Oguro
 #29 - Haruo Chikada
 #30 - Jun Miura, Hajime Anzai
 #31 - Kerry King
 #32 - Kenji Ohtsuki
 #33 - Nanase Aikawa, Shinya
 #34 - Masahiro Takashima
 #35 - Toru Hidaka, Taro Kato (Beat Crusaders)
 #36 - Shiro Sano
 #37 - Yoshio Nomura, Luke Takamura
 #38 - The Collectors
 #39 - George Takahashi
 #40 - Mika Mifune
 #41 - Makoto Ayukawa
 #42 - Starless Takashima
 #43 - Ayako Nakanomori
 #44 - Rize
 #45 - Polysics
 #46 - Triceratops
 #47 - Paul Gilbert, Eu Phoria
 #48 - B-Dash
 #49 - Dohatsuten
 #50 - 
 #51 - Triceratops, Luke Takamura
 #52 - Herman Li & Sam Totman of DragonForce

External links
Rock Fujiyama official site 

Japanese music television series
2006 Japanese television series debuts
2007 Japanese television series endings
TV Tokyo original programming